Kanchanam is a 1996 Indian Malayalam film directed by TN Vasanth Kumar and starring Manoj K Jayan and Srividya in the lead roles.

Cast
 Srividya as Arundhathi Devi
 Manoj K Jayan as James Antony
 Thilakan as Jose
 Madhupal as Siddhu
 Prathapachandran as Adv Swami
 Harishree Ashokan as Easho
 Jose Pallissery as Pattar
 NF Varghese as Prof Ravi
 Narendra Prasad as Billiards Menon
 Vinduja Menon as Anu 
Usharani as Muthassi
Mafia Sasi as Minister's driver
Charuhasan as Minister
Kozhikode Narayanan Nair as Leader
Kanakalatha as Prof Ravi's wife
Sadiq as SP John Scaria
Kanya Bharathi as Meera
Ragini as Khusboo

References

External links

1996 films
1990s Malayalam-language films